Huai Pu Ling is a village and tambon (sub-district) of Mueang Mae Hong Son District, in Mae Hong Son Province, Thailand. In 2005, it had a population of 3,332 people. The tambon contains 11 villages.

References

Tambon of Mae Hong Son province
Populated places in Mae Hong Son province